Endocannibalism is a practice of cannibalism in one's own locality or community. Endocannibalism has also been used to describe the consumption of relics in a mortuary context.

As a cultural practice 
Herodotus (3.38) mentions funerary cannibalism among the Callatiae, a tribe of India.

It is believed that some South American indigenous cultures, such as the Mayoruna people, practiced endocannibalism in the past. The Amahuaca Indians of Peru picked particles of bone out of the ashes of a cremation fire, ground them with corn, and drank them as a kind of gruel. For the Wari' people in western Brazil, endocannibalism was an act of compassion where the roasted remains of fellow Wari' were consumed in a mortuary setting; ideally, the affines (relatives by marriage) would consume the entire corpse, and rejecting the practice would be offensive to the direct family members. Ya̧nomamö consumed the ground-up bones and ashes of cremated kinsmen in an act of mourning; this is still classified as endocannibalism, although, strictly speaking, "flesh" is not eaten. Such practices were generally not believed to have been driven by need for protein or other food.

Medical implications 
Kuru is a type of transmissible spongiform encephalopathy (TSE) caused by prions that are found in humans. Human prion diseases come in sporadic, genetic and infectious forms. Kuru was the first infectious human prion disease discovered. It spread through the Fore people of Papua New Guinea, among whom relatives consumed the bodies of the deceased to return the "life force" of the deceased to the hamlet. Kuru was 8 to 9 times more prevalent in women and children than in men at its peak because, while the men of the village consumed muscle tissues, the women and children would eat the rest of the body, including the brain, where the prion particles were particularly concentrated. Historical research suggests the kuru epidemic may have originated around 1900 from a single individual who lived on the edge of Fore territory, and who is thought to have spontaneously developed some form of Creutzfeldt–Jakob disease, a related prion disease. Oral history records that cannibalism began within the Fore in the late 19th century. Recent research at University College London identified a gene that protects against prion diseases, by studying the Fore people.

Currently there is no treatment to cure or even treatment to control kuru, but there are numerous programs being funded by universities and national institutes, such as the National Institute of Neurological Disorders and Stroke (NINDS). This institute is currently funding research into the genetic and cellular process behind the development and transmission of kuru and other TSE diseases.

Prehistory of endocannibalism controversy 
Whether or not endocannibalism was commonplace through much of human prehistory remains controversial.

A team led by Michael Alpers, a lifelong investigator of kuru, found genes that protect against similar prion diseases were widespread, suggesting that such endocannibalism could have once been common around the world.

A genetic study with a range of authors published by the University College London in 2009 declared evidence of a "powerful episode" of natural selection in recent humans. This evidence is found in the 127V polymorphism, a mutation which protects against the kuru disease. In simpler terms, it would appear the kuru disease has affected all humans to the extent we have a specialised immune response to it. However, a study drawing from hundreds of resources in 2013 claims further that 127V derives from an ancient and wide spread cannibalistic practice, not related to kuru specifically, but "kuru-like epidemics" which appeared around the time of the extinction of the neanderthals who co-existed with humans. This allows the suggestion that cannibalistic practises may have caused diseases which killed the neanderthals, but not the humans because of the 127V resistance gene.

List of cultures known for endocannibalism 
 South America
 Amahuaca people
 Mayoruna
 Wari' people
 Ya̧nomamö

 Asia
 Callatiae
 Aghori

 Africa
 Jukun people

 Oceania
 Fore people

See also 
 Donner Party
 Exocannibalism
 Boone Helm
 List of incidents of cannibalism

References 

Cannibalism
Anthropology
Eating behaviors